The Shuttle Meadow Formation is a Mesozoic geologic formation in the Hartford Basin in Connecticut and Massachusetts, USA. Insect fossils of Mormolucoides articulatus and dinosaur remains are among the fossils that have been recovered from the formation; Coelophysis sp.

See also 
 List of dinosaur-bearing rock formations
 List of stratigraphic units with indeterminate dinosaur fossils

References

Bibliography

Further reading 
 P. Huber, N. G. McDonald, and P. E. Olsen. 2003. Early Jurassic insects from the Newark Supergroup, northeastern United States. In P. M. LeTourneau, P. E. Olsen (eds.), The Great Rift Valleys of Pangea in Eastern North America, Volume 2: Sedimentology, Stratigraphy, and Paleontology 206-223
 P. M. Galton. 1976. Prosauropod dinosaurs (Reptilia: Saurischia) of North America. Postilla 169:1-98

Geologic formations of the United States
Jurassic System of North America
Jurassic Connecticut
Jurassic Massachusetts
Hettangian Stage
Shale formations of the United States
Siltstone formations
Lacustrine deposits
Paleontology in Connecticut